Jenaro Pérez de Villaamil y d'Huguet (3 February 1807 – 5 June 1854) was a Spanish painter in the Romantic style who specialized in landscapes with figures and architectural scenes. He often inflated the scale of the buildings relative to the figures to make them more impressive.

Biography 
He was born in Ferrol, Galicia. In 1812, he was enrolled at the military academy in Santiago de Compostela, where he assisted his father, who was a professor there. He went to Madrid in 1820 to study at the "Reales Estudios de San Isidro" (now part of the Colegio Imperial de Madrid). Three years later, he went to Cádiz to enlist in the army fighting the "Hundred Thousand Sons of Saint Louis" sent by the Duke of Angoulême. He was wounded and briefly held as a prisoner of war. Afterwards, he remained there to study at the "Escuela de Bellas Artes".

In 1830, he went to San Juan, Puerto Rico, with his brother Juan (died 1863), who was also a painter, where they decorated the Teatro Tapia and remained there for a few more years, working as scenographers. Upon his return to Spain in 1833, he made the acquaintance of the Scottish painter David Roberts, who had a decisive influence on his style.

He settled in Madrid in 1834 and became a member of the Real Academia de Bellas Artes de San Fernando the following year. In 1840, he was named honorary court painter to Queen Isabella II. During the regime of Baldomero Espartero, from 1840 to 1844, he left his wife and young child and lived in self-imposed exile in France and Belgium, using artistic affairs as an excuse for his absence. After travelling through Europe, he returned in 1845 and obtained the chair of landscape painting at the Academia, where he later became the director.

He returned to Galicia for an extended stay in 1849 and made extensive travels throughout Spain until 1852, when he began to suffer from liver disease. He died in Madrid two years later, aged only forty-seven.

Selected paintings

Publications
 Jenaro Pérez de Villaamil, with text by Patricio de la Escosura: España artística y monumental: vistas y descripción de los sitios y monumentos más notables de España. París: Alberto Hauser (Imprint of Fain & Thunot); Vol.I 1842, Vol.II 1844, Vol.III 1850.

References

Further reading 
 Enrique Arias Anglés, El paisajista romántico Jenaro Pérez Villaamil, CSIC Press 1986  
 Fernández Malaval, Pastor Cerezo, Dibujos de Jenaro Pérez Villaamil, Comunidad de Madrid; 2001.

External links 

 Lithographs from "España Artística y Monumental" @ the Dipòsit Digital de Documents, Autonomous University of Barcelona.
 Pérez Villaamil  @ the Museo de Bellas Artes de La Coruña website.
 Works by Pérez Villaamil in the "Biblioteca Digital Hispánica" of the Biblioteca Nacional de España.

1807 births
1854 deaths
19th-century Spanish painters
19th-century Spanish male artists
Spanish male painters
People from Galicia (Spain)
Orientalist painters
People from Ferrol, Spain